North coast dialect, also called cearense dialect, is a dialect of Portuguese in the Brazilian state of Ceará, having many internal variations, like in the regions Jaguaribe and Sertões (back-countries).

Main characteristics
 Stronger or low "r" sound, depending on their syllabic position (generally strong at the beginning and middle of words, and weak final syllables). Word-finally it is not pronounced.
 In Fortaleza and metropolitan area, Ceará North and Ceará Northeast, and close hinterland regions, this group there palatalization phonetic, getting affricates to [d͡ʒi] and [t͡ʃi].
 Unique vocabulary is present in this dialect, leading many authors to write books of various dictionaries of such expressions. This, perhaps, is symbolic of the people of Ceará, with their antics and humor. Examples:  (indicates surprise or astonishment, admiration),  (something that is crazy).

References

Brazilian Portuguese
Ceará
Piauí